Mazuyevka is a rural locality (a village) in Kishertskoye Rural Settlement, Kishertsky District, Perm Krai, Russia. The population was 242 as of 2010.

Geography 
Mazuyevka is located 16 km southeast of Ust-Kishert (the district's administrative centre) by road. Chyorny Yar is the nearest rural locality.

References 

Rural localities in Kishertsky District